The following places in New York are called Unionville:
Unionville, Albany County, New York
Unionville, Orange County, New York
Unionville, a hamlet in Potsdam (town), New York